Agyneta uzbekistanica is a species of sheet weaver found in Central Asia. It was described by Tanasevitch in 1984.

References

uzbekistanica
Spiders of Asia
Spiders described in 1984